Maksim Adamavich Bahdanovich (9 December 1891 – 25 May 1917) was a Belarusian poet, journalist, translator, literary critic and historian of literature. He is considered one of the founders of the modern Belarusian literature.

Life 
Bahdanovič was born in Minsk in the family of Adam Bahdanovič, an important Belarusian ethnographer, who through most of his career worked as a bank clerk. Maksim was born in a family apartment at Karakazov House located at Trinity Hill next to the First Parish School. His father was of unlanded peasantry family, while his mother (née Myakota) was of old Belarusian noble family of Kurcz coat of arms that was not adopted in the Russian Empire. Grandfather on his mother side, Apanas Janovich Myakota, was a Russian veteran of the Crimean War who for his military service received a lifelong nobility. Both of Maksim parents graduated pedagogical schools. Later father of Maksim, Adam, was involved with members of the revolutionary anti-tsarist Narodnaya Volya organization.

In 1892, the family moved to Hrodna where Maksim's father received a job at local bank. Soon after the move the future poet's mother, Maria, died of tuberculosis in 1896.

In 1896, Adam Bahdanovič moved with his children to Nizhny Novgorod, Russia. At that time Maksim wrote his first poems in the Belarusian language. In 1902 Bahdanovič attended a gymnasium. During the Revolution of 1905 he was an active participant of the strikes organised by his commilitodes.

In 1907, Nasha Niva came out with Bahdanovič's first published work — the novel Muzyka.

In June 1908, the poet's family moved to Yaroslavl'. After finishing school in 1911 Bahdanovič went to Belarus to meet important figures of the Belarusian Renaissance: Vaclau Lastouski, Ivan Luckievič and Anton Luckievich.
In the same year he began studying of law at a Yaroslavl' lyceum. During his studies Bahdanovič worked at a newspaper, wrote numerous works of literature and was actively published in both Belarus and Russia.

In the beginning of 1914, his only book of poems, Vianok (A Wreath), was published in Vilna (today Vilnius).

In the summer of 1916, after absolvation of the lyceum, Maksim Bahdanovič moved to Minsk and worked there at the local guberniya administration.

In February 1917, Bahdanovič went to Crimea to be treated for tuberculosis. The treatment was unsuccessful, and that year he died in Yalta.

The poet's papers were kept at his father's house, but the collection was heavily damaged during the Russian Civil War in 1918.

Belarusian literature 

In 1991–1995 a full collection of Bahdanovich's poetry was published in Belarus.

Nowadays there are museums of the poet open in Minsk (Maksim Bahdanovič Literary Museum), Hrodna and Yaroslavl'. Several streets in major cities of Belarus and Russia are named after him.

The operas Zorka Venera (by Jury Siemianiaka and Ales' Bachyla), and  Maksim (by Ihar Palivoda).

Bahdanovich created many examples of social, artistic and philosophical lyrics. He was the first poet to introduce several new lyrical forms to Belarusian literature.

Maksim Bahdanovich was a translator of Paul Verlaine, Heinrich Heine, Alexander Pushkin, Ovid, Horace and other poets into Belarusian and of Janka Kupala, Taras Shevchenko, Ivan Franko into Russian.

Literary work 

In 1916, Maksim Bahdanovič wrote a poem “Pahonia”. The music was written by a Belarusian composer and immigrant activist Mikalay Shchahlou-Kulikovich. The song was originally meant to be sung a capella. Mikola Ravienski,  and Vladimir Mulyavin also wrote their own musical arrangements. In the early 1990s, Shchahlou-Kulikovich’s version was considered as one of the options for the national anthem of the Republic of Belarus. In 2020, under the patronage of Anton Mezhy a choral performance of the anthem was recorded with an orchestra accompaniment.

In 2020, the "Pahonia" anthem and the poem resurged in popularity as one of the symbols of the 2020 Belarusian protests against the Lukashenko regime, along with the white-red-white flag. The anthem was spontaneously performed in several public places: near the Belarusian State Philharmonic, in malls, in the Minsk subway, at the Minsk , and at the Minsk railway station.

References

External links 

 Works of Maksim Bahdanovich at the Belaruskaia Palichka
 Maksim Bahdanovič Literary Museum
 Maksim Bahdanovich's poems translated into German
 

1891 births
1917 deaths
People from Minsky Uyezd
Writers from Minsk
20th-century Belarusian poets
Belarusian translators
Translators from Ukrainian
Translators from French
Translators to Belarusian
Translators from Russian
Translators of Alexander Pushkin
Symbolist poets
Belarusian-language writers
Belarusian male poets
20th-century deaths from tuberculosis
20th-century translators
Tuberculosis deaths in Ukraine